The 2016 Men's European Water Polo Championship was held in Belgrade, Serbia.

Serbia won their seventh, and third straight, title by defeating the Montenegro 10–8 in the final. Hungary captured the bronze medal after a 13–10 win over Greece.

Qualification

For the first time, the tournament will be contested by 16 countries (12 previously). The 16 teams qualified as follows:
 The host nation
 The best seven teams from the 2014 European Championships not already qualified as the host nation
 eight qualifiers

Format
The 16 teams were split into four groups of four teams. All teams advance to the knockout stage, from which on a knockout-system will be used to determine the final positions..

Squads

Draw
The draw was held on 4 October 2015.

Preliminary round
All times are local (UTC+1).

Group A

Group B

Group C

Group D

Knockout stage

5th place bracket

9th place bracket

13th place bracket

Round of 16

9–16th place quarterfinals

Quarterfinals

13–16th place semifinals

9–12th place semifinals

5–8th place semifinals

Semifinals

15th place game

13th place game

Eleventh place game

Ninth place game

Seventh place game

Fifth place game

Third place game

Final

Final ranking

Top goalscorers

Source: wpbelgrade2016.microplustiming.com

Awards

References

External links
Official website

Men
2016
International water polo competitions hosted by Serbia
2016 in water polo
International sports competitions in Belgrade
2016 European Water Polo Championship,Men
January 2016 sports events in Europe